The women's shot put at the 2019 World Athletics Championships was held at the Khalifa International Stadium in Doha, Qatar, from 2 to 3 October 2019.

Summary
As the competition was just getting started, defending champion Gong Lijiao put herself into the lead with the only 19 meter throw of the first round 19.07m.  Chase Ealey dropped an 18.70m that held up in second until Danniel Thomas-Dodd almost got 19 with her 18.97m.  In the second round, Gong improved to 19.42m and Thomas-Dodd also improved to 19.07, 2013 champion Christina Schwanitz took over third with an 18.87m.  In the third round, Aliona Dubitskaya tickled the leaders with an 18.86m but that was going to be her best of the day.  Re-ordered in the fourth round, Magdalyn Ewen moved into third with an 18.91m, then Gong tossed the winner .  Ewen improved 2 cm in the fifth round, but then Schwanitz stepped into the ring to let out 19.17m to jump into second place.  In the final round, Thomas-Dodd reclaimed the silver with 19.47m.

Records
Before the competition records were as follows:

Schedule
The event schedule, in local time (UTC+3), is as follows:

Results

Qualification
Qualification: Qualifying Performance 18.40 (Q) or at least 12 best performers (q) advance to the final.

Final
The final was started on 3 October at 22:35.

References

Women's shot put
Shot put at the World Athletics Championships